Similajau National Park (or Samalaju National Park), is a national park in the Bintulu Division of Sarawak, Malaysia.

Formation
The national park includes rainforest, beaches of white and gold-coloured sand, and rocky beaches, facing the South China Sea. It is rich in flora and fauna. The park was first gazetted on 1 December 1976, and published on 20 April 1978. It originally comprised  of forest, starting from Sungai Likau in the south and stretching  to Sungai Similajau in the north.

Flora
The flora consists of three main types, namely; beach, kerangas, a type of tropical moist forest, and mixed dipterocarp forest, which is home to various species of plants, trees and wildlife. It produces a cluster of finger-sized reddish fruits which taste bitter. On maturity, its fruits turn black, similar to coffee berries. This tree is more common here than in any other national park in Sarawak. The Bintangor (Barringtonia asiatica) belongs to the Guttiferae, and can be found in both the hills and swamp forests of Sarawak.

Fauna
The terrestrial fauna of the park include 24 recorded species of mammals, including as gibbons, banded langurs and long-tailed macaque. 185 species of birds have been recorded in the park, including hornbills and migratory water birds like Storm's stork. A noteworthy reptile found here is the saltwater crocodile. Dolphins are found in the sea off the park's coast. Occasionally, green turtles come ashore to lay their eggs.

12 out of the 20 marine mammals recorded in Malaysia occur in Sarawak. These include whales, dugongs and dolphins. Five species of dolphin have been recorded in Bintulu waters: Irrawanddy dolphin (Orcaella brevirostris), bottlenose dolphin (Tursiop trancatus), Indo-Pacific humpback dolphin (Sousa cinensis), finless porpoise dolphin (Neophocaena phocaenoides) and pantropic spotted dolphin (Stenella attenuata). Dolphins occur from March to September every year. They are often spotted in groups of four or more during the early morning.

Three common species of turtle have so far been recorded landing at the park beaches. These turtles are landing to lay their eggs. Three known localities are the Golden Beach, Turtle Beach I and Turtle Beach II. Turtles come during the months of March to September annually. The three species are the green turtle (Chelonia mydas), leatherback turtle (Dermochelyes coriacea), and hawksbill turtle (Eretmochelys imbricate).

There are crocodile in the Likau River, although no crocodile attacks have been reported in the park. There are two species of riverine crocodiles in the park; the false gharial (Tomistoma schlegelii), and an estuarine crocodile (Crocodylus porousus). The estuarine/saltwater crocodile is very dangerous and has been responsible for many fatal attacks in Sarawak in recent years. The false gharial is generally shy and passive, but on rare occasions fatal attacks have been confirmed in Central Kalimantan and Sumatra. Both species should be treated with respect and given distance.

The horseshoe crab, or king crab, often occurs during the dry season starting from early May to October. They usually come in pairs, being the males on top of the females. The males are smaller in sizes as compared to the females. They come to the shore to lay eggs. During this breeding season one can see plenty of catfishes (Ikan belukang) around feeding on the eggs.

Burung kenyalang (hornbill)
There are eight species of hornbill recorded in Sarawak. Wildlife survey shows only few species are found at the park forests. Only solitary species, the black hornbill (Anthracoceros malayanus) is found roaming in the park compound. Early notice during the early morning and late afternoon.

Places of interest

Batu Mandi
It can be reached only by boat. Noticeable from the park only during low tide.

View point
Located at the headlands of Kuala Sungai Likau. It is a shelter, sited strategically for nature lovers to view the marine life, birds and other creature around the park.

Batu Anchau
It is a black bare rock surface situated at the end reach of the Batu Anchau trail and about  walk from the park office.

Selunsur Rapid
It is a rapid that exist at the end reach of the Selunsur Rapid trail. The rapid can be noticed clearly after a heavy down pour and fast flowing of high volume water on the steep rock surface.

Turtle Beach
There are 2 units of Turtle Beach namely Turtle Beach I and Beach II. These are the places where turtles land for laying eggs. This occasionally happens during the month of March till September annually.

Golden Beach
It is a Beach of Wonders. The splendid long stretch of golden sand gives it name Golden Beach. From the park office to the beach is about a  walk. It is again the suitable place for the turtles to land and lay eggs.

Sebubong Pool
It is a natural pool at the Sebubong River. It can only be reached by mean of fast boat as there is no existing rail connecting from the park office.

Nature trails

Main Trail (red mark)
This trail covers  reaching the Golden Beach and can be reached by jungle trekking of about three to four hours journey each way. It can also be reached by fast boat in about forty minutes.

Education Trail (green mark)
Consists of two parts. One is a  plank walk along the mangrove forest and another is a  jungle trail. It is so called Education trail because it is nearby the park office and suitable for any interest parties especially students to know more about tree species.

Circular Trail (red/white mark)

Batu Anchau Trail (white mark)

View Point (red/yellow mark)
It can be reached about 20 minutes walk from the park office.

Selunsur Rapid (yellow mark)
It takes about 2 hours journey (single trip) and 4 hours for the return journey.

Sebubong Pool (red mark)
This trail starts from the Sebubong River mouth and ends at the pool. It can only be reached from the park office by fast boat.

Activities

Jungle trekking
For nature lovers, Similajau National Park provides nature trails. As you trek along the trail you will feel the tranquility of the forest. You are not lonely but are entertained by the music from the friendly insects and beautiful whistling of the birds. The thick forest canopies provide you with fresh air and shades as you walk along.

Bird watching
If you love watching, please bring along a pair of powerful binoculars, zoom-lens cameras and a pocket guide book.

There are plenty of birds (both small, medium and large birds) around the park. Notably the black hornbills are always around.

Snorkeling
Snorkeling can be carried out along the shore line of the park beaches. There are plenty of rocks where we can see different kinds of marine life such as lobsters, shells, crab, fishes. Do not forget to bring along your own equipment as the park office does not provide any.

Barbecuing
There are 20 units of concrete barbecue sets to cater the visitors who love barbecuing. You have to bring along a wire mesh and charcoal / briquette to do the barbecue. The canteen is available to cater foods and drinks.

Crocodile sighting
Crocodile sightings can only be carried out at night. A chartered boat is required to sneak the crocodile along the Likau River. Please use a powerful torch or spot light the eyes of the crocodile. If you are lucky you might be able to see the reptile's whole figure.

Sea and river cruising
Fast boat can be arranged privately. The charges for the cruise depend much on the distance and time taken during the trip. At the moment river cruise usually carried out along Likau River and sea cruise to Batu Mandi and as far as Golden Beach.

Education and research
Nature lovers need to know more about Similajau National Park. The park possesses interesting rock features along the shorelines and also at least seven forest types. At the moment, we have established one unit of Education trail whereby students and nature lovers learn to know more about forest type, flora and fauna as well.

Swimming and picnicking
Swimming and picnicking and also family gathering are usually carried out at the beach in front of the park office.

Other facilities
Other facilities include jungle trails, public toilets and washrooms, canteen, information center and 24-hour electricity. There are four types of accommodation available at the park.

Accommodations
Booking of accommodations can be made through the park office or through visitors' information centers in Miri or Kuching. Advance bookings are always encouraged especially during festive seasons, school holidays and weekends.

References

External links
Tourism Malaysia – Similajau National Park
Sarawak Forestry
Similajau National Park

Protected areas established in 1976
1976 establishments in Malaysia
National parks of Sarawak
Borneo lowland rain forests
Sundaland heath forests
Sunda Shelf mangroves